Mexico competed at the 2016 Summer Olympics in Rio de Janeiro, Brazil, from 5 to 21 August 2016. This was the nation's twenty-third appearance at the Summer Olympics. The Mexican Olympic Committee sent the nation's largest delegation to the Games since 1972, with a total of 124 athletes, 80 men and 44 women, competing across 26 sports.

Mexico left Rio de Janeiro with five medals (three silver and two bronze), failing to win a single gold for the first time since the 2004 Summer Olympics in Athens. Among the medalists were race walker María Guadalupe González, semi-pro boxer Misael Rodríguez (men's middleweight), and modern pentathlete Ismael Hernández, who became the first ever Mexican to ascend the Olympic podium in his signature sport. Diver Germán Sánchez picked up his first individual medal at the Games with a silver in the men's platform, following a runner-up effort with his synchronized diving partner Iván García from London 2012. Taekwondo fighter María Espinoza made history as the first Mexican female to complete a full set of medals in three different Games, adding a silver to her Olympic career haul in the women's +67 kg.

Apart from the success and historic firsts of the medalists, several Mexican athletes reached further to the finals of their respective sporting events, but came closest to the podium finish. Among them were shooter Alejandra Zavala (fourth, women's air pistol), weightlifter Bredni Roque (fourth, men's 69 kg), former Youth Olympian Diego del Real (fourth, hammer throw), diving veteran Paola Espinosa (fourth, women's platform), and archer Alejandra Valencia (fourth, women's individual recurve).

Medalists

|  style="text-align:left; width:78%; vertical-align:top;"|

|  style="text-align:left; width:22%; vertical-align:top;"|

Competitors
The Mexican Olympic Committee (COM) fielded a team of 124 athletes, 80 men and 44 women, across 26 sports at the Games. It was the nation's largest delegation sent to the Olympics since 1972, surpassing the previous mark by an increase of 22 athletes.

Football and volleyball, both of which played by men, were the only team-based sports in which Mexico qualified for the Games, with the latter having returned to the Olympic tournament after more than four decades. For individual-based sports, Mexico made its Olympic debut in mountain biking and golf (new to the 2016 Games), as well as its return to men's beach volleyball and tennis after 16 years.

Track and field accounted for the largest number of athletes on the Mexican team, with 20 entries. There was a single competitor each in badminton, sprint canoeing, equestrian dressage, and Greco-Roman wrestling.

Seven of the nation's Olympic medalists from London 2012 returned, including diving tandem Iván García and Germán Sánchez (men's synchronized platform), as well as their female counterparts Paola Espinosa and Alejandra Orozco (women's synchronized platform); archer and three-time Olympian Aída Román, taekwondo fighter María Espinoza, and football team captain Oribe Peralta, who helped the Mexicans score two goals for a shocking gold-medal victory over Brazil in the men's tournament final. Windsurfer David Mier headed the full roster of Mexican athletes by participating in his fifth consecutive Olympics as the most experienced competitor. He was followed by Espinosa and heavyweight judoka Vanessa Zambotti, both of whom vied for their fourth straight Games.

18-year-old springboard diver Melany Hernández was Mexico's youngest competitor, with dressage rider and two-time Olympian Bernadette Pujals rounding out the field as the oldest competitor (aged 48). Mountain biker Daniela Campuzano was selected by COM to lead the Mexican team as the flag bearer in the opening ceremony.

The following is the list of number of competitors participating in the Games. Note that reserves in fencing, field hockey, football, and handball are not counted as athletes:

Archery

Mexican archers qualified for the women's events after having secured a top eight finish in the team recurve at the 2015 World Archery Championships in Copenhagen, Denmark. Meanwhile, another Mexican archer has been added to the squad by securing one of three available Olympic spots in the men's individual recurve at the Pan American Qualification Tournament in Medellín, Colombia.

Athletics (track and field)

Mexican athletes have so far achieved qualifying standards in the following athletics events (up to a maximum of 3 athletes in each event):

Track & road events
Men

Women

Field events

Badminton

Mexico has qualified one badminton player for the men's singles into the Olympic tournament. Lino Muñoz received a spare Olympic berth freed up by Oceania, as the next highest-ranked shuttler, not yet qualified, in the BWF World Rankings as of 5 May 2016.

Boxing

Mexico has entered five boxers to compete in the following weight classes into the Olympic boxing tournament. Elias Emigdio and Raul Curiel became the first Mexican boxers to be selected to the Olympic team with a top two finish in the AIBA Pro Boxing rankings, while Misael Rodríguez had claimed his Olympic spot with a semifinal victory at the 2016 American Qualification Tournament in Buenos Aires, Argentina.

Joselito Velázquez, Lindolfo Delgado, and Juan Pablo Romero secured additional places on the Mexican roster at the 2016 APB and WSB Olympic Qualifier in Vargas, Venezuela.

Canoeing

Sprint
Mexico has qualified a single boat in men's C-1 200 m for the Games at the 2016 Pan American Sprint Qualifier in Gainesville, Georgia, United States, as the quota spot had been passed to the highest finisher not yet qualified.

Qualification Legend: FA = Qualify to final (medal); FB = Qualify to final B (non-medal)

Cycling

Road
Mexico has qualified one rider in the men's Olympic road race by virtue of their individual ranking among the next two best ranked NOCs at the 2015 Pan American Championships.
One additional spot was awarded to the Mexican cyclist in the women's road race by virtue of a top 22 national finish in the 2016 UCI World Rankings.

Track
Following the completion of the 2016 UCI Track Cycling World Championships, Mexico has entered one rider to compete in the men's omnium at the Olympics by virtue of his final individual UCI Olympic rankings in that event.

Omnium

Mountain biking
Mexico has qualified one mountain bike rider in the women's Olympic cross-country race by virtue of her best individual ranking at the 2015 Pan American Championships.

Diving

Mexican divers qualified for the following individual spots and synchronized teams at the Olympics through the 2015 FINA World Championships and the 2016 FINA World Cup series.

On March 29, 2016, Mexican Olympic Committee had officially announced the entire diving squad for Rio 2016, including Olympic silver medalists Iván García and Germán Sánchez, as well as two-time Olympians Paola Espinosa and Alejandra Orozco, in the men's and women's synchronized platform, respectively.

Men

Women

Equestrian

Mexico has entered one dressage rider into the Olympic equestrian competition by virtue of a top national finish from Central & South America at the 2015 Pan American Games in Toronto, Canada.

Dressage
2008 Olympian Bernadette Pujals was officially selected for individual spot on 17 May 2016. She will compete with Rolex, the horse with whom she previously competed at 2011 and 2015 Pan American Games.

Fencing

Mexican fencers have qualified a full squad in the women's team sabre by virtue of being the highest ranking team from America outside the world's top four in the FIE Olympic Team Rankings. 2012 Olympian Daniel Gómez secured the spot on the Mexican squad in the men's foil by attaining a top two individual placement from America outside the top eight qualified teams in the FIE Adjusted Official Rankings. Meanwhile, Julián Ayala, Alejandra Terán, and Nataly Michel rounded out the Mexican roster by virtue of a top two finish at the Pan American Zonal Qualifier in San José, Costa Rica.

Men

Women

Football

Men's tournament

Mexico men's football team qualified for the Olympics by attaining a top two finish at the 2015 CONCACAF Men's Olympic Qualifying Championship in the United States.

Team roster

Group play

Golf 

Mexico has entered three golfers into the Olympic tournament. Rodolfo Cazaubón (world no. 344), Gaby López (world no. 98), and Alejandra Llaneza (world no. 385) qualified directly among the top 60 eligible players for their respective individual events based on the IGF World Rankings as of 11 July 2016.

Gymnastics

Artistic
Mexico has entered two artistic gymnasts into the Olympic competition. These Olympic berths had been awarded each to the Mexican male and female gymnast, who both participated respectively in the apparatus and all-around events at the Olympic Test Event in Rio de Janeiro.

Men

Women

Judo

Mexico has qualified two judokas for each of the following weight classes at the Games. Going to her fourth Olympics, Vanessa Zambotti was ranked among the top 14 eligible judokas for women in the IJF World Ranking List of May 30, 2016, while Edna Carrillo at women's extra-lightweight (48 kg) earned a continental quota spot from the Pan American region, as the highest-ranked Mexican judoka outside of direct qualifying position.

Modern pentathlon

Mexican athletes have qualified for the following spots to compete in modern pentathlon. Ismael Hernandéz and Tamara Vega secured a selection each in the men's and women's event respectively after obtaining one of the five Olympic slots from the Pan American Games.

Rowing

Mexico has qualified one boat each in both the men's and women's single sculls for the Olympics at the 2016 Latin American Continental Qualification Regatta in Valparaiso, Chile.

Qualification Legend: FA=Final A (medal); FB=Final B (non-medal); FC=Final C (non-medal); FD=Final D (non-medal); FE=Final E (non-medal); FF=Final F (non-medal); SA/B=Semifinals A/B; SC/D=Semifinals C/D; SE/F=Semifinals E/F; QF=Quarterfinals; R=Repechage

Sailing

Mexican sailors have qualified one boat in each of the following classes through the 2014 ISAF Sailing World Championships, the individual fleet Worlds, and North American qualifying regattas.

M = Medal race; EL = Eliminated – did not advance into the medal race

Shooting

Mexican shooters have achieved quota places for the following events by virtue of their best finishes at the 2015 Pan American Games and the 2015 ISSF World Cup series, as long as they obtained a minimum qualifying score (MQS) by March 31, 2016.

Qualification Legend: Q = Qualify for the next round; q = Qualify for the bronze medal (shotgun)

Swimming

Mexican swimmers have so far achieved qualifying standards in the following events (up to a maximum of 2 swimmers in each event at the Olympic Qualifying Time (OQT), and potentially 1 at the Olympic Selection Time (OST)):

Synchronized swimming

Mexico has fielded a squad of two synchronized swimmers to compete only in the women's duet by virtue of their sixth-place finish at the FINA Olympic test event in Rio de Janeiro.

Table tennis

Mexico has entered two athletes into the table tennis competition at the Games. Marcos Madrid and three-time Olympian Yadira Silva secured their Olympic spots in the men's and women's singles, respectively, by virtue of their top six finish at the 2016 Latin American Qualification Tournament in Santiago, Chile.

Taekwondo

Mexico entered four athletes into the taekwondo competition at the Olympics. 2008 Olympic heavyweight champion María Espinoza, Itzel Manjarrez, 2015 Worlds bronze medalist Saúl Gutiérrez, and Carlos Navarro qualified automatically for their respective weight classes by finishing in the top 6 WTF Olympic rankings.

Tennis

Mexico has entered two tennis players into the Olympic tournament. Due to the withdrawal of several tennis players from the Games, Santiago González and Miguel Ángel Reyes-Varela received a spare ITF Olympic place to compete in the men's doubles.

Triathlon

Mexico has qualified four triathletes for the following events at the Olympics. London 2012 Olympian Crisanto Grajales secured the men's triathlon spot with a gold medal triumph at the 2015 Pan American Games. Meanwhile, Rodrigo González, Irving Pérez, Claudia Rivas, and Cecilia Pérez were selected among the top 40 eligible athletes each in the men's and women's triathlon based on the ITU Olympic Qualification List as of May 15, 2016.

Volleyball

Beach
Mexico men's beach volleyball team qualified directly for the Olympics by virtue of their nation's top 15 placement in the FIVB Olympic Rankings as of June 13, 2016. The place was awarded to the rookie duo Juan Virgen and Lombardo Ontiveros.

Indoor

Men's tournament

Mexico men's volleyball team qualified for the Olympics by scoring a first-place triumph and securing a lone outright berth at the final meet of the World Olympic Qualifying Tournament in Mexico City, signifying the nation's return to the sport for the first time since it hosted the 1968 Summer Olympics.

Team roster

Group play

Weightlifting

Mexican weightlifters have qualified three women's quota places for the Rio Olympics based on their combined team standing by points at the 2014 and 2015 IWF World Championships. A single men's Olympic spot had been added to the Mexican roster by virtue of a top seven national finish at the 2016 Pan American Championships.

Wrestling

Mexico has qualified one wrestler for the men's Greco-Roman 85 kg into the Olympic competition, as a result of his semifinal triumph at the 2016 Pan American Qualification Tournament.

Men's Greco-Roman

See also
Mexico at the 2015 Pan American Games
Mexico at the 2016 Winter Youth Olympics

References

External links 

 

Nations at the 2016 Summer Olympics
2016
2016 in Mexican sports